Basidiodendron is a genus of fungi in the order Auriculariales. Basidiocarps (fruit bodies) are corticioid, thin, effused and are typically found on fallen wood. The genus is widespread in both temperate and tropical regions and contains over 30 species.

Taxonomy
The genus was introduced for a single species by Brazilian mycologist Johannes Rick in 1938, but its modern interpretation was established by Canadian mycologist E. Robena Luck-Allen in 1963. She placed a number of species previously referred to Bourdotia into Basidiodendron based microscopically on their septate basidia, the presence of gloeocystidia, and the production of basidia on distinctive "involucrate" stalks.

Molecular research, based on cladistic analysis of DNA sequences, has substantially supported Luck-Allen's circumscription of Basidiodendron, though the less typical, larger-spored species remain as yet unsequenced.

Species
Basidiodendron alni
Basidiodendron caesiocinereum
Basidiodendron caucasicum
Basidiodendron cinerellum
Basidiodendron cinereum
Basidiodendron cremeum
Basidiodendron deminutum
Basidiodendron excentrispora
Basidiodendron eyrei
Basidiodendron farinaceum
Basidiodendron fulvum
Basidiodendron glaucum
Basidiodendron globisporum
Basidiodendron grandinioides
Basidiodendron groningae
Basidiodendron inconspicuum
Basidiodendron iniquum
Basidiodendron luteogriseum
Basidiodendron mexicanum
Basidiodendron microsporum
Basidiodendron minutisporum
Basidiodendron nikau
Basidiodendron olivaceum
Basidiodendron parile
Basidiodendron pelinum
Basidiodendron pini
Basidiodendron radians
Basidiodendron remotum
Basidiodendron rimosum
Basidiodendron robenae
Basidiodendron salebrosum
Basidiodendron spiculosum
Basidiodendron spinosum
Basidiodendron trachysporum
Basidiodendron walleynii
Basidiodendron widdringtoniae

References

External links

Auriculariales
Agaricomycetes genera